The Fred A. Huber Trophy was awarded annually by the International Hockey League to the North American ice hockey team with the most points during the regular season. The trophy for the league championship was originally named the J. P. McGuire Trophy, the owner of Detroit car dealership, and sponsor. In 1954, the trophy was renamed for Fred A. Huber Jr. On September 24, 2007, the second incarnation of the IHL renamed the Tarry Cup as the Huber Trophy as a tribute to the original league.

Winners

References
 Fred A. Huber Trophy winners  www.azhockey.com

International Hockey League (1945–2001) trophies